John Leslie "Wes" Montgomery (March 6, 1923 – June 15, 1968) was an American jazz guitarist. Montgomery was known for his unusual technique of plucking the strings with the side of his thumb, and for his extensive use of octaves, which gave him a distinctive sound.

Montgomery often worked with his brothers Buddy (Charles F.) and Monk (William H.) and with organist Melvin Rhyne. His recordings up to 1965 were oriented towards hard bop, soul jazz, and post bop, but around 1965 he began recording more pop-oriented instrumental albums that found mainstream success. His later guitar style influenced jazz fusion and smooth jazz.

Biography
Montgomery was born in Indianapolis, Indiana. According to NPR, the nickname "Wes" was a child's abbreviation of his middle name, Leslie. The family was large, and the parents split up early in the lives of the children. Montgomery and his brothers moved to Columbus, Ohio, with their father and attended Champion High School. His older brother Monk dropped out of school to sell coal and ice, gradually saving enough money to buy his brother Wes a four-string tenor guitar from a pawn shop in 1935. Although Montgomery spent many hours with the guitar, he recounted this time later in life, saying he had to start over when he got his first six-string several years later.

Career

He and his brothers returned to Indianapolis. In 1943 Montgomery found work as a welder and got married. At a dance with his wife, he heard a Charlie Christian record for the first time. This motivated him to buy a six-string guitar the next day. For nearly a year, night and day, he tried to imitate Christian and teach himself the guitar. Although he hadn't intended to become a musician, he felt obligated to learn after buying the guitar. He received no formal instruction and couldn't read music. By the age of twenty he was performing in clubs in Indianapolis at night, copying Christian's solos, while working during the day, first at a milk company. In 1948, when Lionel Hampton was on tour in Indianapolis, he was looking for a guitarist, and after hearing Montgomery play like Christian he hired him.

Montgomery spent two years with the Hampton band. Fear kept him from flying with the rest of the band, so he drove from city to city, town to town, while fellow musicians marveled at his stamina. When arriving at a club, the first thing he did was call home to his wife and family. He was given the opportunity to play with Charles Mingus, Milt Buckner, and Fats Navarro, but not the opportunity he hoped for, and he returned to Indianapolis a better player, though tired and discouraged. He resumed performing at local clubs, this time with the Eddie Higgins Trio and the Roger Jones Quintet, playing with  Eddie Higgins, Walter Perkins, and Leroy Vinnegar. He joined his brothers Buddy and Monk and saxophonist Alonzo "Pookie" Johnson in the Johnson/Montgomery Quintet, somewhat in the style of George Shearing. The band auditioned for Arthur Godfrey and recorded sessions with Quincy Jones. After a residency at a club from 1955 to 1957, Montgomery and his brothers went west.

Buddy and Monk Montgomery formed The Mastersounds and signed a contract with Dick Bock at Pacific Jazz. Montgomery joined them for a recording session in 1957 that included Freddie Hubbard. Some of the songs were released by Pacific Jazz on the album The Montgomery Brothers and Five Others, while others were issued on Fingerpickin' (Pacific Jazz, 1958). The Mastersounds remained in California when Montgomery returned to Indianapolis to work in his trio with organist Melvin Rhyne.

He worked as a welder during the day to support his wife and seven children, then performed at two clubs at night until well into the morning. He was a smoker who had blackouts while trying to maintain this busy schedule. During one performance, the audience included Cannonball Adderley, George Shearing, and Lennie Tristano. Adderley was so impressed by Montgomery's guitar playing that he persuaded Orrin Keepnews to sign him to Riverside. Keepnews was also persuaded by a gushing review written by Gunther Schuller. In New York City Montgomery recorded A Dynamic New Sound, the Wes Montgomery Trio, his first album as a leader after twenty years as a musician. In 1960, he recorded The Incredible Jazz Guitar of Wes Montgomery with Tommy Flanagan, Percy Heath, and Albert Heath.

He joined his brothers in California to perform as the Montgomery Brothers for the Monterey Jazz Festival. The Mastersounds had broken up, and Buddy and Monk had signed with Fantasy and recorded (with Wes) The Montgomery Brothers, followed by Groove Yard. Montgomery recorded another album as a leader, So Much Guitar, then while visiting his brothers had a chance to perform with John Coltrane's group in San Francisco. In 1961, work was getting harder to find. A tour in Canada led to the album The Montgomery Brothers in Canada, then the band broke up. Montgomery returned to Indianapolis to work in his trio with Rhyne. Keepnews sent him back to California to record a live album with Johnny Griffin, Wynton Kelly, Paul Chambers, and Jimmy Cobb. Their performance became the album Full House. This was followed by Fusion! (1963), his first instrumental pop album.

After two more organ trio jazz sessions for Riverside Records in 1963 (Boss Guitar and Portrait of Wes), Montgomery left the label for Verve Records. At Verve, Montgomery began working with producer Creed Taylor, who produced Montgomery for the rest of the guitarist's life. His first Verve release, Movin' Wes (1964), was an instrumental pop album arranged by Johnny Pate. It quickly sold more than 100,000 copies and repositioned Montgomery within the recording industry as a crossover artist capable of significant LP sales. At Verve, Montgomery released his last two small-group jazz albums  (a 1965 collaboration with Wynton Kelly, and a 1966 collaboration with organist Jimmy Smith), but his main focus was recording contemporary pop hits as instrumentals. Montgomery had notable success with his versions of "California Dreamin'", "Tequila", and "Goin' Out of My Head". After moving to A&M, Montgomery had his biggest radio hit, a version of "Windy", a pop song originally recorded by The Association. Of the ten Wes Montgomery albums that Taylor produced while Montgomery was alive (all recorded for Verve and A&M Records), eight were aimed at the pop market. The success of these albums led to invitations for Montgomery to perform on major U.S. television shows including The Hollywood Palace and The Tonight Show Starring Johnny Carson.

Death
Montgomery died of a heart attack on June 15, 1968, while at home in Indianapolis. He was 45 years old.

Technique
According to jazz guitar educator Wolf Marshall, Montgomery often approached solos in a three-tiered manner: he would begin the progression with single note lines, derived from scales or modes; after a fitting number of sequences, he would play octaves for a few more sequences, finally culminating with block chords. He used mostly superimposed triads and arpeggios as the main source for his soloing ideas and sounds.

Instead of using a guitar pick, Montgomery plucked the strings with the fleshy part of his thumb, using down strokes for single notes and a combination of up strokes and down strokes for chords and octaves. He developed this technique not for technical reasons but for the benefit of his neighbors and not waking his children.  He wanted to still play through an amplifier so he developed his thumb picking style.  He worked long hours as a machinist before his music career began and practiced late at night. To keep everyone happy, he played quietly by using his thumb. His style smoothly incorporated the guitar into jazz and was studied by many.

Awards and honors
 Second Place, Readers' Poll, Metronome, 1960
 Most Promising Jazz Instrumentalist, Billboard, 1960
 Talent Deserving Wider Recognition, DownBeat, 1960
 Readers' Poll and Critics' Poll, DownBeat, 1961
 Readers' Poll and Critics' Poll, DownBeat, 1962
 Best jazz guitarist, DownBeat magazine Critics' Poll, 1960–63, 1966, 1967
 Grammy Award nominations, (two), Bumpin', 1965
 Grammy Award, Best Instrumental Jazz Performance by Large Group or Soloist with Large Group,  Goin' Out of My Head, 1966
 Jazz Man of the Year, Record World, 1967
 Grammy Award, "Eleanor Rigby" and "Down Here on the Ground", 1968
 Grammy Award nomination, Willow Weep for Me, 1969

Praise for Wes Montgomery
Stevie Wonder wrote two tributes to Montgomery: "Bye Bye World", which appeared on his 1968 album Eivets Rednow, and "We All Remember Wes", which George Benson recorded for his 1978 live album Weekend in L.A.

In 1982, Bob James and Earl Klugh collaborated on a duet album and recorded the song "Wes" as a tribute to Montgomery on the album Two of a Kind.

Guitarist Emily Remler released a tribute album to Montgomery in 1988, titled East to Wes.

Pat Martino released Remember: A Tribute to Wes Montgomery in 2006. 

Eric Johnson paid tribute to Montgomery on his 1990 album Ah Via Musicom in a song titled "East Wes".

Jazz guitarist Bobby Broom said that on A Dynamic New Sound in 1959, Montgomery "introduced a brand new approach to playing the guitar... The octave technique... and his chord melody and chord soloing playing still is today unmatched". Broom modeled his guitar-organ trio after Montgomery's.

Lee Ritenour recorded a tribute album in 1993, Wes Bound, that contained Montgomery covers and some originals by Ritenour. While the production and arrangements are typical for the time, he played the whole album in Montgomery style on a Gibson L-5 model.

Discography

As leader 
Lifetime

 1959 The Wes Montgomery Trio (Riverside, 1959)
 1960 The Incredible Jazz Guitar of Wes Montgomery (Riverside, 1960)
 1960 Movin' Along (Riverside, 1960)
 1961 So Much Guitar (Riverside, 1961)
 1961 Bags Meets Wes! with Milt Jackson (Riverside, 1962)
 1962 Full House (Riverside, 1962)
 1959-63 Guitar on the Go (Riverside, 1963)
 1963 Boss Guitar (Riverside, 1963)
 1963 Fusion! Wes Montgomery with Strings (Riverside, 1963)
 1963 Portrait of Wes (Riverside, 1966)
 1964 Movin' Wes (Verve, 1964)
 1965 Bumpin' (Verve, 1965)
 1965 Willow Weep for Me (Verve, 1969)
 1965 Smokin' at the Half Note with Wynton Kelly (Verve, 1965)
 1966 Goin' Out of My Head (Verve, 1965)
 1966 California Dreaming (Verve, 1966)
 1966 Tequila (Verve, 1966)
 1966 Jimmy & Wes: The Dynamic Duo with Jimmy Smith (Verve, 1966)
 1966 Further Adventures of Jimmy and Wes with Jimmy Smith (Verve, 1968)
 1967 A Day in the Life (A&M, 1967)
 1967-68 Down Here on the Ground (A&M, 1968)
 1968 Road Song (A&M, 1968)

With Buddy Montgomery and Monk Montgomery
 1958 The Montgomery Brothers and Five Others (Pacific Jazz)
 1958 The Mastersounds, Kismet (World Pacific)
 1960 Montgomeryland (Pacific Jazz)
 1960 The Montgomery Brothers (Fantasy)
 1961 George Shearing and the Montgomery Brothers (Jazzland)
 1961 The Montgomery Brothers in Canada (Fantasy)
 1961 Groove Yard (Riverside)

Posthumous
 The Alternative Wes Montgomery (Milestone, 1982)
 Far Wes (Capitol, 1990) –  compilation
 Fingerpickin' (Capitol, 1996) – compilation
 Echoes of Indiana Avenue (Resonance, 2012)
 In the Beginning (Resonance, 2015)
 One Night in Indy (Resonance, 2016)
 Smokin' in Seattle (Resonance, 2017)
 In Paris: The Definitive ORTF Recording (Resonance, 2017)

As sideman 
 Jon Hendricks, A Good Git-Together (Pacific Jazz, 1959)
 Cannonball Adderley, Cannonball Adderley and the Poll-Winners (Riverside, 1960)
 Nat Adderley, Work Song (Riverside, 1960)
 Harold Land,  West Coast Blues! (Jazzland, 1960)

References

External links
 Official site
 Examples of Montgomery's licks and signature patterns
 "Wes Montgomery Unedited" by Jim Ferguson, compiled from his Guitar Player magazine article (August 1993), his JazzTimes article "The Genius of Wes Montgomery" (August 1995), and his liner notes from Wes Montgomery: The Complete Riverside Recordings (1992)
 "Wes Montgomery - The King of Octaves" - analysis and transcription of Road Song solo.
 Comprehensive and regularly updated Discography of Wes Montgomery.
 Compositions of Wes Montgomery.
 
 
 Find a Grave - Wes Montgomery

1923 births
1968 deaths
Guitarists from Indiana
Musicians from Indianapolis
20th-century American guitarists
African-American jazz guitarists
American jazz guitarists
Grammy Award winners
Riverside Records artists
Verve Records artists
Montgomery Brothers members
CTI Records artists
20th-century African-American musicians